Marcus Rosner (born August 10, 1989) is a Canadian actor. He has appeared in a wide variety of television and film projects since 2012. Some of his more notable roles include appearances in the TV shows Unreal, Arrow, Supernatural, and Once Upon a Time.

Life and career
Marcus Rosner was born in Campbell River, British Columbia. He moved around a lot as a child but was raised primarily in Sherwood Park, Alberta. He started out his career as an actor in Vancouver, British Columbia and has spent time living in Toronto, Ontario.

Filmography

References

External links
 
 

1989 births
Living people
21st-century Canadian male actors
Canadian male television actors
Male actors from British Columbia
People from Campbell River, British Columbia